Octagon City is a ghost town in Allen County, Kansas, United States.  It was a failed intentional community that was founded in 1856 about six miles (10 km) south of Humboldt, Kansas near the Neosho River.  It was created by the Vegetarian Kansas Emigration Company, headed by prominent vegetarian Henry S. Clubb and entrepreneurs Charles DeWolfe and John McLaurin.  The original intent was to build a vegetarian commune on the south side of the Neosho River for vegetarians only, but investor interest in a non-vegetarian moral community was much higher and so the decision was made to build Octagon City on the north side of the Neosho River to make the entire project sustainable.  Members of Octagon City were under oath to educate their children and uphold a moral lifestyle.

The city's design was influenced by Orson Squire Fowler, a leading advocate of octagon house architecture.  Octagon City would feature an octagonal town square from which would radiate eight roads. Between the roads, in a four-square-mile area, sixty-four families would build octagonal farmhouses with octagonal barns.

During May 1856, about 100 participating settlers arrived at the development site, expecting a blossoming town with grist mill and sawmill, but finding only one log cabin, one plow, and dozens of tents sheltering families. Mosquitoes, a flu-like epidemic ascribed to malnutrition, exhaustion, or malaria, the threat of Border Ruffians, and strong thunderstorms were a continuous problem. By early July the springs feeding the community had dried up. Some residents chose to live at an Osage Indian settlement a few miles away, which had a flowing spring, but they were forced to flee back to Octagon City upon learning that the tribe was about to return from its annual buffalo hunt. The summer months saw a continuous exodus of settlers and the population quickly thinned. By August, crop theft by Indians became a major problem.

Very few of those remaining past summer had any intention of making permanent homes in Kansas. They waited only for opportunities to get away.  By 1857 only four of the original residents were left, and the survivors reported more illness as the weather became warmer again.

The area remained remote until 1873 with the arrival of the railroad.  The town of Chanute, Kansas sprang up four miles (6 km) south of the former commune.  Nothing survives of the settlement except the tributary Vegetarian Creek.  A marker was erected near the site in 1986, but due to repeated vandalism it was removed in 2001 and donated to the St. Paul/Neosho County Museum.

References

Further reading

 Octagon City, Joseph G. Gambone, American History Illustrated 10:10-15, August 1975.
 History of Neosho County, St. Paul, Kan. Journal Press, 1951, p. 260 (via HeritageQuest).

External links
 Went to Kansas - An Ill-Fated Expedition to That Fairy Land, and its Sad Results, Miriam Davis Colt, 1862.
 Personal Memoirs of Watson Stewart
 A Michigander, A Patriot and Gentleman, by James Gregory
 Vandalism forces historian to quit post after 15 years, Dodge City Daily Globe, October 3, 2001.
 Octagon City - The Vegetarian Haven
 Allen County maps: Current, Historic, KDOT

Communalism
Utopian communities in the United States
Populated places established in 1856
Former populated places in Kansas
Former populated places in Allen County, Kansas
Vegetarian communities
Intentional communities in the United States
1856 establishments in Kansas Territory
Architecture related to utopias